CASB as an acronym may refer to:

California Southern Bankruptcy Court, the United States bankruptcy court for the Southern District of California
Canadian Aviation Safety Board, former name of the Transportation Safety Board of Canada
Civil Aviation Safety Bureau of Hungary or Civil Aviation Safety Board
Cloud access security broker
Cost Accounting Standards Board, a U.S. board that sets government contract cost standards